"Godzilla" is a song by American rapper Eminem featuring fellow American rapper and singer Juice Wrld, released as a single on January 28, 2020, from the former's eleventh studio album Music to Be Murdered By (2020). The song was Juice Wrld's first posthumous release following his death the previous month in December 2019.

Background
American rapper Juice Wrld's feature on the track marked his first posthumous release following his fatal seizure resulting from a drug overdose on December 8, 2019. Eminem's third verse on the track holds the record for his fastest rap verse, rapping 10.65 syllables per second, or 300 words in 30 seconds. Eminem surpassed his own records held by his feature on Nicki Minaj and Labrinth's 2018 song "Majesty", where he rapped 10.3 syllables per second, and his 2013 song "Rap God", where he rapped 9.6 syllables per second.

Music video
On March 4, 2020, a lyric video for the single was released. On March 6, Eminem released a snippet of the music video, partnered with Lyrical Lemonade. The music video, directed by Cole Bennett, released on March 9, featuring appearances by Mike Tyson, Dr. Dre, and a dedication to Juice WRLD at the end. As of February 2023, the song has over 547 million views on YouTube.

Chart performance
"Godzilla" was a success in the United States and Europe. It debuted at number one in Finland and on both the UK Singles Chart and the Irish Singles Chart, becoming Eminem's tenth and ninth number-one single in the UK and Ireland, respectively, as well as the first for Juice Wrld posthumously and in total in both countries. It also went to number two in Flanders, the Czech Republic, Hungary, New Zealand, and Slovakia. It went to number three in both artists' homeland, the United States, and went top ten in 20 regions. Outside Europe, it saw moderate success in Lebanon and Singapore, peaking inside the top 20 in those regions. As of November 3, the song has sold more than 3 million units in the US and became eligible for 3 times platinum. As of August 8, 2021, the song has sold more than 5 million album-equivalent units, being eligible for 5 times platinum in the U.S.

Awards and nominations

Charts

Weekly charts

Year-end charts

Certifications

Release history

References

2020 singles
2020 songs
Eminem songs
Juice Wrld songs
UK Singles Chart number-one singles
Irish Singles Chart number-one singles
Number-one singles in Finland
Songs released posthumously
Music videos directed by Cole Bennett
Songs written by Eminem
Songs written by Juice Wrld
Songs written by D.A. Got That Dope
Aftermath Entertainment singles
Shady Records singles
Interscope Records singles
Godzilla (franchise)
Song recordings produced by Eminem